Gabriel's Dream is a documentary film directed by Anne Lévy-Morelle. It tells the story of Gabriel de Halleux, an established businessman who, in the late 1940s, decided to leave everything and start a new life in Chile Chico, in the depths of the Chilean Patagonia. In December 1997, Gabriel's Dream received the André Cavens Award for Best Film given by the Belgian Film Critics Association (UCC).

References

External links

1997 films
Belgian documentary films
French documentary films
1990s French-language films
French-language Belgian films
1990s French films